Nisan Danon is an Israeli footballer who plays for the Israeli club Ironi Or Yehuda.

Honours
Liga Leumit
Winner (1): 2016-17

References

1993 births
Israeli Jews
Living people
Israeli footballers
Association football forwards
Sektzia Ness Ziona F.C. players
Hapoel Ramat Gan F.C. players
Maccabi Herzliya F.C. players
Ironi Nesher F.C. players
Maccabi Jaffa F.C. players
F.C. Kafr Qasim players
Maccabi Netanya F.C. players
Hapoel Katamon Jerusalem F.C. players
Hapoel Kfar Saba F.C. players
Hapoel Ashkelon F.C. players
Hapoel Rishon LeZion F.C. players
Nordia Jerusalem F.C. players
Ironi Kuseife F.C. players
Liga Leumit players
Footballers from Ness Ziona